Diego Jiménez Torres Airport  was a public use airport owned by the Puerto Rico Ports Authority and located  south of Fajardo, a city in Puerto Rico. It is also known as Fajardo Airport.

Airport operations were shut down in November 2008 and transferred to the newly opened José Aponte de la Torre Airport in Ceiba. In February 2015 the FAA announced the permanent closure of the airport on April 30, 2015.

Facilities
The asphalt paved runway designated 8/26 measured 3,600 by 75 feet (1,097 x 23 m), and is marked closed.

Airlines
At the time of closing, air taxi service was provided by the following airlines:
 Air Flamenco
 Isla Nena Air
 M&N Aviation
 Vieques Air Link

See also
 List of airports in Puerto Rico
 Transportation in Puerto Rico
 Aviation in Puerto Rico

References

External links
 OpenStreetMap - Fajardo Airport
 
 

Airports in Puerto Rico
Defunct airports in Puerto Rico
Fajardo, Puerto Rico
Airports disestablished in 2015